England women's cricket team toured the West Indies in October 2016. The tour consisted of a series of five One Day Internationals with the final three matches of the series being part of the 2014–16 ICC Women's Championship. The England women's training preparations were interrupted because of Hurricane Matthew. Despite the threat of the hurricane, the series went ahead as planned. England women won the 5-match series 3–2.

Squads

ODI series

1st ODI

2nd ODI

3rd ODI

4th ODI

5th ODI

References

External links
 Series home at ESPN Cricinfo

International cricket competitions in 2016–17
England 2016
2014–16 ICC Women's Championship
West Indies 2016
2016 in English women's cricket
2016 in West Indian cricket
2016 in women's cricket